Stanley Vollant  (born April 2, 1965) is an Innu surgeon from the aboriginal community of Pessamit, which is located by the course of the St-Lawrence River, in the Côte-Nord region of Quebec.

Career
Vollant pursued his secondary and post-secondary education in the Québec region before obtaining a MD diploma from Université de Montréal in 1989. He then completed his training in 1994 with a specialization in general surgery. In 1994, Vollant became the first aboriginal surgeon born in Québec, Canada. He specializes in laparoscopy. In December of the same year, Vollant began his career as a general surgeon in the Baie-Comeau Regional Medical Centre. Ten years later, he joined the CSSS of Chicoutimi as part of the general surgery services. He then moved on to Montfort Hospital in Ottawa where he worked as a general surgeon and as an assistant professor and director of the aboriginal program of the Faculty of Medecine of the University of Ottawa. In 2010, he became the coordinator of the Aboriginal component of the Faculty of Medicine of University of Montreal and continued to practise medicine at the Pessamit Medical Clinic, in his home village. Vollant is now a general surgeon at the Dolbeau-Mistassini Hospital.

Vollant represented 9,000 doctors as the president of l’Association médicale du Québec and served on the Executive Board of the Canadian Medical Association. Vollant was member of various organisations such as the Canadian Health Council, the Science Advisory Board of Health Canada, the Ministerial Advisory Council on Rural Health, the Conseil de la santé et du bien-être du Québec, the Comité d’éthique des sciences et technologies du Québec.

Vollant travels on foot paths trodden by his ancestors, the Innu Meshkenu. His work aims to facilitate the meeting of people in First Nations communities and neighbouring communities to, among others, inspire young people about the importance of education and the acquisition of healthy habits. He also collects seniors’ knowledge and traditional medicine to contribute to the preservation and transmission of this heritage. He began his march totalling nearly 6,000 kilometres in the Fall of 2010 and expects to complete his journey in 2017.

In pursuit of his objectives, Vollant founded in 2016 the organization Path of Thousand Dreams. The mission of this foundation is "To inspire and support First Nations, Métis and Inuit to make their own journey of a thousand dreams through the development of their full mental, spiritual, physical and emotional potential."

Awards and distinctions 
 He was appointed to the Order of Canada in 2022, "for his visionary leadership in ethical governance and corporate responsibility, and for his transformative advocacy of collaborative philanthropy."
 Exceptional merit (gold) medal from the Lieutenant Governor of Quebec, 2017
 Top 50 des personnes qui font la promotion de la santé au Québec–WIXX Campaign from Québec en forme, 2017
 Hommage bénévolat-Québec Award – Ministère de l’Emploi et de la Solidarité sociale, 2016
 Knight of the National Order of Quebec, 2014
 First Nations and Inuit Suicide Prevention Association of Québec and Labrador Award, 2013
 Prestige Award – Québec Medical Association, 2013
 Best Teacher Award – Students from the faculty of Medecine of Université de Montréal, 2012
 Queen Elizabeth II Diamond Jubilee Medal, 2012
 Medecine, Culture, and Society Award – University of Montréal, 2012
 Quarante médecins qui ont fait l’histoire – L’Actualité médicale du Québec, 2010
 First Nations and Inuit Suicide Prevention Association of Québec and Labrador Award, 2010
 Médecin de cœur et d’action Award – Association des médecins de langue francophone du Canada, 2005
 National Aboriginal Achievement Award – National Aboriginal Achievement Foundation, 2004 
 Courage and Personal Achievement Award – La Presse, 2001
 Personality of the Week – La Presse, 2001
 Aboriginal Role Model Award – General Governor of Canada, 1996

Bibliography 
 Laurence Lemieux, Tracer son chemin, Comic book.
 Mathieu-Robert Sauvé, Dr Stanley Vollant : mon chemin innu, Biography.

References

External links 
 

1965 births
Living people
20th-century First Nations people
21st-century First Nations people
Canadian surgeons
Indspire Awards
Innu people
Knights of the National Order of Quebec
Members of the Order of Canada
Physicians from Montreal